Aphonopelma paloma, or the Paloma dwarf, is a species of spider belonging to the family Theraphosidae.

Distribution and habitat
The Paloma dwarf can be found in Southern Arizona, but require meticulous surveying to spot. This is not only due to their small size, as the entrances of their burrows are usually only 5–10 mm in width.

References

 http://www.americanarachnology.org/JoA_free/JoA_v20_n3/JoA_v20_p189.pdf

paloma
Spiders of the United States
Natural history of Arizona
Spiders described in 1993